Hawthorne Boulevard may refer to
Hawthorne Boulevard (California), located in Los Angeles County
Hawthorne Boulevard (Portland, Oregon)
"Hawthorne Boulevard" (song), an unreleased Beach Boys instrumental

Road disambiguation pages